The 2021–22 Kategoria e Parë is the 74th official season of the Albanian football second-tier since its establishment. The season began on 11 September 2021 and ended on 7 May 2022. There are 16 teams competing this season. The winning and runner-up teams will gain promotion to the 2022-23 Kategoria Superiore. The promotion play-offs winner will play a promotion play-off match against the 8th ranked team of the 2021–22 Kategoria Superiore.

Changes from last season

Team changes

From Kategoria e Parë
Promoted to Kategoria Superiore:
 Dinamo Tirana
 Egnatia

Relegated to Kategoria e Dytë:
 Elbasani
 Flamurtari
 Oriku
 Partizani B
 Veleçiku

To Kategoria e Parë
Relegated from Kategoria Superiore:
 Apolonia
 Bylis

Promoted from Kategoria e Dytë:
 Butrinti
 Maliqi
 Shkumbini
 Tërbuni

Locations

Stadia by capacity and locations

League table

Results

Positions by round
The table lists the positions of teams after each week of matches.

Promotion play-offs
<onlyinclude>

Semi-finals

Final

Korabi qualified to the final play-off match.

Relegation play-offs

Pogradeci was relegated to Kategoria e Dytë, while Oriku was promoted to Kategoria e Parë.

Both teams remained in their respective leagues.

Top scorers

References

2021-22
2
Albania